Avren may refer to two villages in Bulgaria:

 Avren, Varna Province
 Avren, Kardzhali Province